is a passenger railway station located in the city of Anan, Tokushima Prefecture, Japan. It is operated by JR Shikoku and has the station number "M12".

Lines
The Home Express Anan, a one-way only evening limited express service from  terminates at Anan.

Layout
The station consists of 2 side platforms serving two tracks. A siding and a passing loop branch off track 2 and run on the other side of platform 2. The present station building, completed in 2003 is a  structure where passenger facilities are located on a bridge which spans the tracks.

The main station entrance is on the west side  of the tracks from where elevators and escalators lead to the bridge structure on level 2 which houses ticket gates, a waiting area, a JR ticket window (without a Midori no Madoguchi facility) and a JR travel centre (Warp Plaza). From the bridge, separate escalators and elevators connect to both platforms.

On level 1 near the main entrance on the west side are toilets and tenantable shop space. A large designated parking area for bicycles is located nearby.

On the east side of the tracks, the hashigami bridge structure also connects to a neighbouring building as well as a second station entrance from road. Another bicycle parking area and parking lots for cars are available near this entrance.

Adjacent stations

History
Anan Station was opened on 27 March 1936 by Japanese Government Railways (JGR) under the name . On 1 November 1966, the name of the station was changed to Anan. On 1 April 1987, with the privatization of Japanese National Railways (JNR), the successor of JGR, JR Shikoku took over control of the Station.

In November 2003, the present station building, incorporating a hashigami design, was completed and opened.

Passenger statistics
In fiscal 2019, the station was used by an average of 1614 passengers daily

Surrounding area
Anan City Hall
Anan City Cultural Center (Dream Hall)
Anan City Commerce and Industry Promotion Center
Anan Chamber of Commerce
Anan City Tomioka Elementary Schooll

See also
List of railway stations in Japan

References

External links

Anan Station (JR Shikoku)

Railway stations in Tokushima Prefecture
Railway stations in Japan opened in 1936
Anan, Tokushima